Dane Robert van der Westhuyzen (born 16 August 1992) is a South African professional rugby union player who last played for the . His regular position is hooker.

Career

Youth

He then joined the EPRU Academy and played for the  side in the 2012 Under-21 Provincial Championship, starting all eight of his side's matches as they made it to the final of the competition, scoring one try against  en route. Van der Westhuyzen started the final, helping them to beat  24–10.

He was equally as involved for the U21s in the 2013 Under-21 Provincial Championship – this time round also captaining the side – making eight appearances as the team progressed all the way to the final.

Eastern Province Kings

He made his first class debut in the Vodacom Cup in their match against Argentine invitational side, and made a total of six appearances in the competition, all from the bench.

Despite initially being released at the end of the 2013 season, he was later offered a one-year contract extension for 2014. He made four appearances in the 2014 Vodacom Cup competition and was included in their squad for the 2014 Currie Cup Premier Division, but failed to make any appearances for the side and was again released at the end of the season.

Leopards

He was a member of the  team that won the 2015 Currie Cup First Division. He featured in a total of eleven matches during the 2015 Currie Cup qualification rounds and First Division proper and scored two tries for the side.

References

South African rugby union players
Eastern Province Elephants players
Living people
Alumni of St. Andrew's College, Grahamstown
1992 births
People from Queenstown, South Africa
Rugby union hookers
Rugby union players from the Eastern Cape